"The Delayed Arrival" is the fourth episode of the fourth series of the 1990s British comedy television series Jeeves and Wooster. It is also called "Arrested in a Night Club".

In the US, it was aired as the third episode of the third series of Jeeves and Wooster on Masterpiece Theatre, on 24 October 1993. "Jeeves Saves the Cow-Creamer" aired as the fourth episode of the fourth series instead.

Background 
Adapted from Jeeves and the Feudal Spirit.

Cast
 Bertie Wooster – Hugh Laurie
 Jeeves – Stephen Fry
 Aunt Dahlia – Jean Heywood
 Florence Craye – Francesca Folan
 Stilton Cheesewright – Nicholas Palliser
 Percy Gorringe – Walter James
 Uncle Tom – Ralph Michael
 Mrs Trotter – Sylvia Kay
 Mr Trotter – John Rapley
 Magistrate – Peter Howell
 Mr Burwash – James Ottaway
 Seppings – Ian Collier
 Oofy Prosser – Richard Dixon
 Police – Jon Croft, Peter Diamond, Jim Barclay

Plot
Aunt Dahlia's magazine is in deep money trouble again so she wants to sell it to a Mr Trotter. To make it more saleable, she plans on paying a thousand pounds to a famous novelist for a story, which means she has to pawn her pearl necklace. Meanwhile, Lady Florence Craye has an on-off engagement with the homicidal Darcy "Stilton" Cheesewright, with Bertie being the cause of the break-ups. An expert is brought in to value the pearls, which have been replaced with fakes, and there is a race on to sell the magazine and get the real ones back in time. Aunt Dahlia wants help from Jeeves to find a pearl necklace she has pawned. Jeeves appears in drag in this episode to impersonate the novelist Daphne Dolores Morehead.

See also
 List of Jeeves and Wooster characters

References

External links

Jeeves and Wooster episodes
1993 British television episodes